Raúl Navas Paúl (born 3 May 1978 in Cádiz, Andalusia) is a Spanish former professional footballer who played as a goalkeeper.

External links

Stats and bio at Cadistas1910 

1978 births
Living people
Spanish footballers
Footballers from Cádiz
Association football goalkeepers
Segunda División players
Segunda División B players
Divisiones Regionales de Fútbol players
Cádiz CF B players
Cádiz CF players
CD Tenerife players
Córdoba CF players
Xerez CD footballers
Gibraltar Premier Division players
Lincoln Red Imps F.C. players
Spanish expatriate footballers
Expatriate footballers in Gibraltar
Spanish expatriate sportspeople in Gibraltar